The 7th Arizona State Legislature, consisting of the Arizona State Senate and the Arizona House of Representatives, was constituted from January 1, 1925, to December 31, 1926, during the first and second years of George W. P. Hunt's fifth tenure as Governor of Arizona, in Phoenix.

Sessions
The Legislature met for the regular session at the State Capitol in Phoenix on January 12, 1925; and adjourned on June 14.

There was no special session, which would have met during 1926, during this legislature.

State Senate

Members
The asterisk (*) denotes members of the previous Legislature who continued in office as members of this Legislature.

Employees
 Secretary: W. J. Graham
 Assistant Secretary: May Belle Craig
 Sergeant-at-Arms: S. F. Langford
 Chaplain: Reverend Victor A. Rule

House of Representatives

Members
The asterisk (*) denotes members of the previous Legislature who continued in office as members of this Legislature.

References

Arizona legislative sessions
1925 in Arizona
1926 in Arizona
1925 U.S. legislative sessions
1926 U.S. legislative sessions